"Pray 4 Love" is a song by American rapper and singer Rod Wave, released on March 18, 2020 as the fourth single from his second studio album of the same name.

Composition
On the song Rod Wave raps and sings over a mid-tempo instrumental, with R&B influences that can be heard on the transitions played on piano. He discusses topics about his "varying friendships" and other life experiences, such as trust issues and wariness around beautiful women. In an interview with Complex regarding his album Pray 4 Love, Wave stated that the song was "a summary for the album".

Charts

Certifications

References

2020 singles
2020 songs
Rod Wave songs
Songs written by Rod Wave